The 1977 WCHA Men's Ice Hockey Tournament was the 18th conference playoff in league history. The tournament was played between March 9 and March 17, 1977. All games were played at home team campus sites including the championship series. By reaching the finals both Wisconsin and Michigan were invited to participate in the 1977 NCAA Division I Men's Ice Hockey Tournament.

This was the first year that the WCHA had named one tournament champion in twelve years. After this championship the conference would revert to awarding two teams the postseason title for an additional four years.

Format
The top eight teams in the WCHA, according to their final conference standings, were eligible for the tournament and were seeded No. 1 through No. 8. In the first round the first and eighth seeds, the second and seventh seeds, the third and sixth seeds and the fourth and fifth seeds were matched in two-game series where the school that scored the higher number of goals was declared the winner. After the first round the remaining teams were reseeded No. 1 through No. 4 according to their final conference standings and advanced to the second round. In the second round the first and fourth seeds and the second and third seeds competed in an additional two-game, total goal series with the winners of each advancing to the championship series, again a two-game, total goal match.

Conference standings
Note: GP = Games played; W = Wins; L = Losses; T = Ties; PTS = Points; GF = Goals For; GA = Goals Against

Bracket

Teams are reseeded after the first round

Note: * denotes overtime period(s)

First round

(1) Wisconsin vs. (8) Colorado College

(2) Notre Dame vs. (7) Minnesota

(3) Michigan vs. (6) Michigan Tech

(4) Denver vs. (5) North Dakota

Semifinals

(1) Wisconsin vs. (7) Minnesota

(3) Michigan vs. (4) Denver

Championship

(1) Wisconsin vs. (3) Michigan

Tournament awards
None

See also
Western Collegiate Hockey Association men's champions

References

External links
WCHA.com
1976–77 WCHA Standings
1976–77 NCAA Standings
2013–14 Colorado College Tigers Media Guide
2013–14 Denver Pioneers Media Guide
2013–14 Michigan Wolverines Media Guide; Through the Years 
2013–14 Minnesota Golden Gophers Media Guide 
2013–14 North Dakota Hockey Media Guide
2008–09 Notre Dame Fighting Irish Media Guide; History
2003–04 Wisconsin Badgers Media Guide

WCHA Men's Ice Hockey Tournament
Wcha Men's Ice Hockey Tournament